Middletown is the name of more than one location in the U.S. state of Pennsylvania:

Middletown, Dauphin County, Pennsylvania of the Harrisburg metropolitan area, zip code 17057
Middletown (Amtrak station)
Middletown, Northampton County, Pennsylvania, zip code 18017
Middletown Township, Bucks County, Pennsylvania, zip code 19047
Middletown Township, Delaware County, Pennsylvania, zip code 19063
Middletown Township, Susquehanna County, Pennsylvania
Middletown, McKean County, Pennsylvania, on Pennsylvania Route 646

See also
Middleburg (disambiguation)
Middletown (disambiguation)
Middletown Township, Pennsylvania (disambiguation)
West Middletown, Pennsylvania, Washington County